Ferenc Demjén (born 21 December 1946) is a Hungarian rock singer, songwriter and bassist. Besides a solo career, he was the member of bands Bergendy and V'Moto-Rock, and played an important part in the rock culture of the country, contributing to nearly 150 albums.

Career 
Ferenc Demjén was born on 21 December 1946 in Diósgyőr. His father was an engineer at the Diósgyőr Steel Company, and after he was fired because of political reasons, the family moved to Budapest, where he got a ministry job. Demjén, who graduated as a chemist technician, was inspired by his fathers singing talent, and started to study music, largely on his own.

After starting as a bassist in bands Számum, Liversing, Dogs, Meteor, Sakk-Matt, Tűzkerék and Szabadság Szálló Kulcsár, he met István Bergendy in 1970, who invited him to play in his band. He debuted as a songwriter with Jöjj vissza vándor, scoring his first success, resulting in weekly performances in the popular E-Klub and Ifjúsági Park. They gained country-wide popularity by performing in the National Television's show at New Year's Eve in 1970. Their first open concert was in 1971 in the Kisstadion stadium. In 1972 they won second place in the year's Táncdalfesztivál with the song Úgy Szeretném.

Demjén left the band in 1977 and released his first solo album while forming the successful band V'Moto-Rock in the same year. He worked with Klári Katona and Kati Kovács on their first albums. His song for the film Szerelem első vérig (1987) topped the Hungarian charts for 8 months. After V'Moto-Rock disbanded in 1988, Demjén began a solo career, releasing an album almost every year in the nineties.

In 1988, while traveling in the US, he met Rebecca at the New York City HardRock Cafe.  They began traveling together and soon married.

He received the Order of the Hungarian Republic, Officer's rank in 1996.

Solo discography 

Fújom a dalt (1977)
A szabadság vándora (1989)
Elveszett gyémántok (1990)
A föld a szeretőm (1991)
Demjén Ferenc & Sztárvendégei (concert recording) (1992)
Demjén –Hat (1993)
Dalok a szerelemről (1994)
Nekem 8 (1994)
Félszáz év (1996)
Ünnep '96 (concert recording) (1996)
Best of Demjén (selection) (1997)
Ezzel még tartozom (1997)
Demjén 13 (1998)
2000 éves álmok (1999)
Álmok, Csodák, Szerelmek (2001)
Hívlak (2003)
Aréna 2004.12.30 (concert recording) (2005)
Demjén60 (2006)
A lelkünk most is vágtat (2009)
Így fogadj el igazán (2010)
Túl a világvégén (2013)
Még lázad a szív (2018)

See also 
Hungarian pop

Sources 
 – Biography at Dunántúli Napló Online
 – Biography az Zene.hu

External links 
demjenferenc.hu – Official Website
demjenfansite.com – A fan site dedicated to

1946 births
20th-century Hungarian male singers
Living people
Hungarian bass guitarists
Male bass guitarists
21st-century Hungarian male singers